Khok Samrong is a district (amphoe) of Lopburi province in central Thailand. The district is the transportation hub of the province. Kasetsart University's Lopburi campus is in Tambon Phaniat, Khok Samrong District.

History
Originally named Phu Kha, the minor district (king amphoe) was renamed Sa Bot in 1909. In 1915 it became a full district and renamed Khok Samrong, as the district office was relocated there.

Geography
Neighbouring districts are (from the north clockwise) Nong Muang, Sa Bot, Chai Badan, Phatthana Nikhom, Mueang Lopburi and Ban Mi.

Administration
The district is divided into 13 sub-districts (tambons), which are further subdivided into 137 villages (mubans). The township (thesaban tambon) Khok Samrong covers parts of the tambon Khok Samrong. There are a further 13 tambon administrative organizations (TAO). 

Missing numbers are tambon which now form Nong Muang and Khok Charoen Districts.

References

Khok Samrong